Marrero is a census-designated place (CDP) in Jefferson Parish, Louisiana, United States. Marrero is on the south side (referred to as the "West Bank") of the Mississippi River, within the New Orleans–Metairie–Kenner metropolitan statistical area. The population was 32,382 at the 2020 U.S. census.

History 
Marrero was named in honor of the Louisiana politician and founder of Marrero Land Company, Louis H. Marrero. The area was originally referred to and shown on maps as "Amesville", after the Boston businessman Oakes Ames, who purchased much of the land following the Civil War. In February 1916, the U.S. Postmaster officially changed the name of the Post Office to "Marrero".

Louis Herman Marrero was born in Adams County, Mississippi, on July 17, 1847. When he was a child his family moved to St. Bernard Parish, Louisiana. During his school years at Jackson, Louisiana, the Civil War began, and Marrero joined Captain Scott's Command, later known as the 25th Louisiana Regiment.

Geography

Marrero is located west of the Intracoastal Canal on the Mississippi River, at coordinates  (29.886017, -90.109930). It is bordered to the east by Harvey, to the west by Westwego, and to the north, across the Mississippi, by New Orleans.

Demographics

The 2019 American Community Survey estimated 30,894 people lived in the CDP, down from 33,141 at the 2010 U.S. census. In 2020, the population was 32,382. At the 2019 census estimates, the racial and ethnic makeup was 50.1% Black or African American, 37.2% non-Hispanic white, 0.4% American Indian and Alaska Native, 5.2% Asian, 0.2% some other race, 2.0% multiracial, and 4.9% Hispanic and Latino American of any race. Per the following census in 2020, the composition was 50.12% Black or African American, 21.9% non-Hispanic white, 0.49% American Indian and Alaska Native, 5.48% Asian, 0.01% Pacific Islander, 3.42% two or more races, and 8.57% Hispanic or Latino American of any race; this reflects the greater diversification of the United States at the time of this census, becoming less predominantly non-Hispanic white. In 2019, the median household income was $44,866 and 21% of the population lived at or below the poverty line.

Education

Marrero's public schools are operated by the Jefferson Parish Public School System.

High Schools:
L.W. Higgins High School
John Ehret High School (outside of the CDP limits)

L.H. Marrero Middle School is in Marrero. Parts of Marrero are zoned to Worley Middle in Westwego, Louisiana and Truman Middle in Marrero .

Elementary schools in Marrero include:
 Judge Lionel R. Collins Montessori School
 It was previously called Ames Montessori School. In 2011 the school board voted to rename it after an African-American judge who died in 1988. He was the first African-American man elected to a Jefferson Parish-level political office.
 Lincoln Elementary School for the Arts
 Miller Wall Elementary School
 Ella C. Pittman Elementary School
Schools outside of Marrero serving portions include Vic A. Pitre Elementary School in Westwego, Estelle Elementary in Estelle.

In regards to advanced studies academies, some residents are zoned to the Marrero Academy and some are zoned to the Gretna Academy.

The Roman Catholic Archdiocese of New Orleans operates two high schools:
Archbishop Shaw High School, all-boys school
Academy of Our Lady, all-girls school

Jefferson Parish Library operates the Belle Terre Library in Marrero.

Notable people

Sherman A. Bernard (1925-2012), politician
Robert Billiot, former Marrero resident; state representative for Jefferson Parish; retired educator in Westwego
Marty Booker, NFL player for Chicago Bears, Miami Dolphins, and Atlanta Falcons
Paul Carr, actor
Chimdi Chekwa, football player
Patrick Connick, politician
Ryan Clark, NFL player
Brett P. Giroir, Assistant Secretary for Health at HSS, 2018-
Stephen Jackson, composer
Tory James, athlete
Norman Jefferson, former NFL player
Mickey Joseph, former football quarterback and college football coach
Vance Joseph, defensive coordinator for the Arizona Cardinals
Kordell Stewart, former NFL player for Pittsburgh Steelers
Chris Ullo, politician
Reggie Wayne, football player for Indianapolis Colts

References

Census-designated places in Louisiana
Census-designated places in Jefferson Parish, Louisiana
Census-designated places in New Orleans metropolitan area
Louisiana populated places on the Mississippi River